PS Beltim stands for Persatuan Sepakbola Belitung Timur (en: Football Association of East Belitung). PS Beltim is an  Indonesian football club based in East Belitung Regency, Bangka Belitung Islands. They play in Liga 3.

Honours 
 ISC Liga Nusantara Bangka Belitung Islands
 Champion (1): 2016
 Liga 3 Bangka Belitung Islands
 Third-place (1): 2021
 Soeratin Cup Bangka Belitung U17
 Champion (1): 2017

References

External links

Football clubs in Indonesia
Football clubs in Bangka Belitung Islands